Vijay Superum Pournamiyum is a 2019 Indian Malayalam-language romantic comedy film, written and directed by Jis Joy, starring Asif Ali and Aishwarya Lekshmi, along with Balu Varghese, Siddique, Aju Varghese and Renji Panicker in supporting roles. It is a remake of the Telugu film Pelli Choopulu (2016) which itself is based on a true story. The film's musical score was composed by debutant Prince George. It was released on 11 January 2019 to positive reviews from the critics and the audience. The movie had a run of 100 days at Kerala box office.

The film was produced by A. K. Sunil under the banner of New Surya Films. The film is the third collaboration of Jis Joy and Asif Ali, who earlier worked together in Bicycle Thieves and Sunday Holiday. The director had earlier said that it would be a small, message-driven film with elements suitable for a family audience.

Plot 
Vijay (Asif Ali) goes to Pournami's (Aishwarya Lekshmi) house for a prospective first alliance meeting. He has completed his B.Tech, which took him over 5 years, including the make up exams. He is lazy and not very interested in doing any work. His dream is to become a chef and open a restaurant, but he doesn't get any support from his father. Pournami, on the other hand, is very focused and works hard to fulfill her dreams of going to Australia. However, her father does not approve of her idea to go abroad, as she is a girl. When both  Pournami and Vijay meet at the matrimonial first meeting, her younger cousin accidentally locks the door and they get locked out. To pass their time, they talk about their past. Pournami reveals that she was in love with a North Indian man named Naresh. They wanted to start a food truck business together. Naresh went to Delhi to talk with his father about their love and business plans. Meanwhile, Pournami started working on her plan eagerly and was ready to surprise Naresh by buying the truck. Naresh does not show to the meeting with her parents, overpowered by the greed of getting dowry. Pournami and her father waited for him but when they realize that Naresh wasn't coming back, her father decides to get her married to someone else.

When it was Vijay's turn to share his past, he reveals that he was unemployed and was always goofing around with his two friends. They made cooking videos together as he is passionate about cooking. But it wasn't profitable enough so, they plan to make prank videos and were caught red-handed by Vijay's father's brother, which ended their plan. He then got a job in a call-center on his father's recommendation. He started going out with a girl to show off to his friends, but she cheated on him. He found out about it only when her actual boyfriend called him at work. Vijay quit his job after having a fight with his boss.

It was then revealed that Vijay came to the wrong address for his matchmaking event. Later, Vijay goes to his actual matchmaking event, which was with a rich family. Meanwhile, Pournami tells the guy coming to her matchmaking event that she's not interested in marriage. The family of Vijay's bride wanted him to be able to run a business. Vijay and Pournami decide to operate the food truck themselves, with Vijay as the chef, and Pournami in charge of the business side of things. At first, they face many difficulties, mainly because of Vijay's and his friends' laziness as well as disagreements with Pournami. This ended when they gave up on the food truck.

Vijay's grandmother visits Pournami's house and tells her father that he should be proud to have such a responsible daughter. She wishes to have a daughter like Pournami in the future. Vijay insists that her father let her pursue her dreams. Pournami recognizes Vijay's good wishes. Pournami later convinces his father that he is an expert cook by cooking them one of Vijay's recipes. They kickstart their business with support from both their parents. After this, their food truck becomes a smashing success. In the process, they fall in love without realizing it, but both of them are engaged to other people, so they drift apart. After realizing they love each other, they come back together through a radio show organized by their friend, with the support of their family and friends. They start their food truck business and K.S. Chitra visits them. Afterwards, it is revealed that they got married.

Cast 

 Asif Ali as Vijay / Vijay 'Super'
 Aishwarya Lekshmi as Pinky / Pournami
 Balu Varghese as Roshan, Vijay's friend
 Renji Panicker as Venugopal, Pournami's father
 Siddique as Chandramohan, Vijay's father
 Aju Varghese as YouTube Cleetus
 Shanthi Krishna as Radhamani, Pournami's mother
 Darshana Rajendran as Pooja, Pournami's friend
 Joseph Annamkutty Jose as Vijay's friend
 Austin Dan as Naresh, Pournami's ex-boyfriend
 Aileena Amon as Sonam
Anish Kuruvilla as Sonam's father
 Sharan as Hotel Singer
 Devan as Vijay's uncle
 K. P. A. C. Lalitha as Vijay's grandmother
 Maya Menon as Vijay's mother
 Sonu Anna Jacob as Vijay's sister
 Sathi Premji as Pournami's grandmother
 Srikant Murali as Event manager
 Shaheen Siddique as Salman, Sonam's love interest
 Viviya Santh as Reshma, Vijay's ex-girlfriend
 Anjali Nair as Paurnami's neighbor
 Punnassery Kanchana as Bedridden grandma
Hakkim Shahjahan as Vishal
Santhosh Pali
 Gayathri as Grandma's daughter  (Cameo Appearance)
 Niranj Suresh as Surya (Cameo Appearance)
 Shashikala Nedungadi as Surya's mother (Cameo Appearance)
 Rajesh Sharma as Doctor (Cameo Appearance)
 K. S. Chithra as herself ( Cameo Appearance)
 Harisanth Sharan as singer (Cameo Appearance)

Production 
In March 2018, director Jis Joy announced his third project, starring Asif Ali and Mamta Mohandas in the lead roles, during the 100 day celebration of his previous film Sunday Holiday. Later, actress Aishwarya Lekshmi bagged the female lead replacing Mamta. Principal photography began in July 2018. Locations included Kochi, Bengaluru and Pondicherry. Filming wrapped by that September.

Music 
The songs featured in the film were composed by Prince George, while the film score was composed by 4 Musics.

Release 
The film was released in 114 theatres in Kerala on 11 January 2019. After a successful run in the home state, on 24 January, it was released in GCC centres. The movie was released in major centres such as Dubai, Sharjah, Abu Dhabi, Oman, Bahrain, Qatar and Kuwait.

Critical response 
The Times of India reviewer Deepa Soman rated it 3/5 and stated, "The film is a decent watch on the whole, with warmth in its heart. If not approached with high expectations, the boisterous characters might offer you a good time". Sify stated that the film is a watchable romantic comedy and rated 2.5/5. The Hindu said "The core story of an aimless youth finding his purpose with the help of a girl does not have much novelty in it, but Jis Joy manages to inject a few fresh elements, which makes it enjoyable in parts. It is almost like a movie version of a ‘You too can win’ self-help book, filled with just too many feel-good moments.".

Satellite rights 
The movie's satellite rights were bagged by leading Malayalam television channel Mazhavil Manorama.

Awards

References

External links 
 

2010s Malayalam-language films
2019 films
2019 romantic comedy films
Films directed by Jis Joy
Indian romantic comedy films
Malayalam remakes of Telugu films